Lansdowne is a historic home located at Urbanna, Middlesex County, Virginia.  It was constructed about 1740, and is a two-story, five-bay, "T"-shaped, brick dwelling in the Early Georgian style. It consists of a main section measuring 52 feet by 25 feet, with a rear wing of 36 feet by 18 feet. The front facade features a tall pedimented portico projecting from the center bay.  It was the home of diplomat Arthur Lee (1740-1792), who is buried on the property in the family cemetery. Lee helped to negotiate and signed the 1778 Treaty of Alliance, which allied France and the United States together during the American Revolutionary War. 

It was listed on the National Register of Historic Places in 1974.  It is located in the Urbanna Historic District.

External links

References

Georgian architecture in Virginia
Houses completed in 1740
Houses in Middlesex County, Virginia
Houses on the National Register of Historic Places in Virginia
Individually listed contributing properties to historic districts on the National Register in Virginia
Lee family residences
National Register of Historic Places in Middlesex County, Virginia
1740 establishments in Virginia